Henry Benjamin Whipple (February 15, 1822 – September 16, 1901) was the first Episcopal bishop of Minnesota, who gained a reputation as a humanitarian and an advocate for Native Americans.

Summary of his life

Born in Adams, New York, he was raised in the Presbyterian church but became an Episcopalian through the influence of his grandparents and his wife, Cornelia, whom he married in 1842.  Whipple attended Oberlin College from 1838–1839 and worked in his father's business until he was admitted to holy orders in 1848.

After ordination Whipple served parishes in Rome, New York, and Chicago, where he gained a reputation for his service to poor immigrant groups.  His Chicago ministry drew him to the attention of the newly formed Episcopal Diocese of Minnesota which elected him its first bishop in 1859. He served until his death in 1901.

Although concerned with establishing his denomination in the new state of Minnesota, Whipple soon began to champion the cause of Native American groups in the state against what he saw as an abusive and corrupt Federal policy towards Indians. He is best known for his clemency pleas in favor of a group of Dakota or Sioux who fought against the United States government in the U.S.-Dakota War of 1862 in the area around New Ulm, Minnesota. On December 26, 1862, the largest mass execution in U.S. history occurred in Mankato during the pause in US military operations. Thirty-eight Dakota were hanged for war crimes in the conflict. A total of 303 were sentenced to be hanged but President Lincoln commuted 265 in the largest mass commutation on record. Lincoln's intervention was not popular at the time. Two commemorative statues are located on the site of the hangings (now home to the Blue Earth County Library and Reconciliation Park). He was referred to as "Straight Tongue" by Dakota Indians because of his honesty in dealing with them.

Whipple is memorialized by the Bishop Whipple Federal Building in Fort Snelling, Minnesota, which houses, among other things, offices for members of Minnesota's congressional delegation. His name is also found on a building on the campus of Concordia College in Moorhead, Minnesota, called Bishop Whipple Hall, a building which was originally a prep school built by Episcopalians but which was purchased by Norwegian Lutherans in 1891 as the main building of their newly founded Concordia College.

Shattuck School (now coordinated with St. Mary's Hall and St. James School as Shattuck-St. Mary's School, formerly The Bishop Whipple Schools: Shattuck, St. Mary's, St. James) is a prominent Episcopal boarding preparatory school in Faribault, Minnesota, which grew up around the campus of Seabury Divinity School, which Whipple founded. (The seminary itself merged with Western Theological Seminary in Evanston, Illinois, and the campus of Seabury-Western Theological Seminary was in Evanston until its merger with Bexley Hall, and what is now known as Bexley Seabury Seminary has its campus on the south side of Chicago.) The main boy's dormitory at Shattuck is called Whipple Hall. He is buried beneath the altar of the Cathedral of Our Merciful Saviour in Faribault, Minnesota.

Early life
Henry Benjamin Whipple was born on February 15, 1822, in Adams, New York. He was educated at a private boarding school in Clinton, New York, and at Jefferson County Institute in Watertown, New York. In 1839, he attended Oberlin Collegiate Institute, but his health failed and his physician recommended an active business life.

Career

After several years working for his father, a country merchant, Whipple began studying for the ministry in the Episcopal Church. He was ordained a deacon on August 17, 1849, became rector of Zion Church in Rome, New York, in November 1849, and was ordained priest on July 16, 1850. Whipple served as rector of Zion Church from 1849–1857, becoming known both for the size and wealth of his parish and for his work among the poor. In 1857, Whipple helped organize and became the first rector of the Church of the Holy Communion, on Chicago's South Side, the first free church in the city. He drew his parishioners from "the highways and the hedges" - clerks, laborers, railroad men, travelers, and derelicts - sought converts among the city's Swedish population, and regularly officiated in a Chicago prison.

On June 30, 1859, Whipple was elected the first Episcopal bishop of Minnesota, an office he held until his death more than forty years later. He was consecrated bishop on October 13, 1859, the feast day of James, brother of Jesus, at St. James Episcopal Church during the General Convention in Richmond by bishops Jackson Kemper, Leonidas Polk, and William H. DeLancey, with George Burgess delivering the sermon. In December of that year, Whipple made his first visitation of his diocese, including the Ojibwe missions of E. Steele Peake and John Johnson Enmegahbowh. In the spring of 1860 he moved his family to Faribault, establishing it as the see of the diocese.

During his episcopate, Whipple guided the development of the Episcopal Church in Minnesota from a few missionary parishes to a flourishing and prosperous diocese. For many years, especially during the first two decades of his episcopate, he made regular missionary sojourns by wagon or coach through the rural areas of the state, often in mid-winter, preaching in cabins, school houses, stores, saloons, and Indian villages. Until the diocese was financially secure, he pledged himself to personally support several of its missionary clergy and assumed many other financial obligations of the church. He unified a diocese that at the time of his election was divided into two quarreling factions.

In 1860, Whipple incorporated the Bishop Seabury Mission in Faribault, building it upon the foundations laid by James Lloyd Breck and Solon W. Manny, who in 1858 had founded a divinity school and school for boys and girls. With the help of gifts from eastern donors, the mission developed into three separate but closely connected schools: Seabury Divinity School, Shattuck School for boys, and St. Mary's Hall for the education of daughters of the clergy. Whipple also helped found the Breck School in Wilder, Minnesota, to educate the children of farmers.

Advocate for Native Americans
Whipple was best known outside of Minnesota for his dedication to the welfare of the American Indians and for his missionary work among Dakota and Ojibwe in Minnesota. He returned from his first visitation of his diocese with a firm commitment to establish Indian missions and reform of the United States Indian system. Whipple regularly included Indian villages on his visitations, built up the Episcopal mission to the Ojibwe based at the White Earth Reservation, and appealed for support of Indian missions by lectures throughout the United States and in Europe.

In the early years of his episcopate, Whipple's espousal of Indian reform and commitment to Indian missions earned him the enmity of many whites who hated Indians, and led some of his fellow bishops to look upon him as a fanatic. His attitude was denounced most bitterly after Minnesota's Dakota Conflict of 1862, when, in appeals to President Lincoln and through the press, Whipple opposed wholesale executions and extermination or deportation of the Dakota. Whipple even criticized his distant cousin and former Minnesota governor, Colonel Henry Sibley in such matters.

Later episcopate

Although a high churchman in doctrine, Whipple preached tolerance of all views which fell within the scope of the church's basic teachings. Urging that the church's task was to "preach Christ crucified" and that sectarian quarrels hindered this mission, Whipple pleaded for unity among all branches of the Episcopal and Anglican communions, and for harmonious relations among members of all Christian denominations. Both in Chicago and in Minnesota, Whipple worked closely with ministers and communicants of the national Swedish church. His interest in the church's missionary efforts was reflected in his presidency of the Western Church Building Society (1880–1893), service on several committees and commissions of the General Convention concerned with missionary affairs, and special missions to Cuba and to Puerto Rico.

From the late 1870s until his death, Whipple's health compelled him to spend the winter months each year at his winter home in Maitland, Florida, where he held missionary services and in 1880 built the Carpenter Gothic Church of the Good Shepherd on land which he had purchased. The church was consecrated on March 17, 1883, and Whipple conducted regular services there each winter for the rest of his life.
Henry B. Whipple died on September 16, 1901, having survived his coadjutor Mahlon Norris Gilbert.

Family

Whipple married Cornelia Wright, daughter of Benjamin and Sarah Wright of Adams, New York in 1842. They had six children. Cornelia Whipple died in 1890 from injuries suffered in a railroad accident. In 1896 Whipple married Evangeline Marrs Simpson, widow of industrialist Michael Hodge Simpson.

His son, John Hall Whipple, was mysteriously killed in 1878. An anonymous writer confessed to the murder, alleging that he killed the bishop's son to avenge a wrong.

State Senator David Wager (1804–1870) was his uncle; and United States Army General Henry Halleck (1815–1872) was his first 
cousin.

Honors
Whipple was elected a member of the American Antiquarian Society in 1894.

He was elected as the first President of the Florida Audubon Society (FAS) in 1900, a year before his death.

References

Bibliography
Cushman, Joseph D., Jr., A Goodly Heritage: The Episcopal Church in Florida, 1821-1892, (1965) Gainesville: University of Florida Press, discusses Whipple's winters in Florida and has a picture of the church he built in Maitland.
 Hein, David. "Straight Tongue: Bishop Henry Benjamin Whipple." The Historiographer, vol. 41, no. 2 (Pentecost 2003), pp. 15–17. (The Historiographer is a publication of the Historical Society of the Episcopal Church and the National Episcopal Historians and Archivists.)
 Malone, Dumas ed. "Dictionary of American Biography", Vol X p. 668
 
 Whipple, Henry Benjamin. The Lights and Shadows of a Long Episcopate. London: Macmillan Co. 1912.

External links

Henry Benjamin Whipple in MNopedia, the Minnesota Encyclopedia 
Material by and about Whipple, with bibliography from Project Canterbury
 Whipple's personal papers and Minnesota diocesan records are available at the Minnesota Historical Society.

Whipple's Genealogy
 Short biography of Evangeline Marrs Whipple, includes a photo of her and Whipple
 
 

1822 births
1901 deaths
Episcopal bishops of Minnesota
People of Minnesota in the American Civil War
Dakota War of 1862
Oberlin College alumni
People from Faribault, Minnesota
People from Rome, New York
People from Adams, New York
People from Maitland, Florida
General Society of Colonial Wars
Members of the American Antiquarian Society
19th-century American Episcopalians
Converts to Anglicanism from Presbyterianism
19th-century American clergy